Alberto Camargo (born 28 February 1967) is a Colombian former racing cyclist. He rode in nine Grand Tours between 1987 and 1994.

Major results

1987
 7th Overall Vuelta a Colombia
1988
 8th Overall Vuelta a Colombia
1989
 1st Stage 21 Vuelta a España
 6th Overall Clásico RCN
1st Prologue
 8th Overall Volta a Catalunya
 10th Overall Critérium du Dauphiné Libéré
1990
 1st Stage 12 Vuelta a España
1992
 1st Overall Vuelta a los Valles Mineros
1st Stage 2
 1st Stage 6 Clásico RCN
 5th Overall Critérium du Dauphiné Libéré
 9th Overall Euskal Bizikleta
1994
 1st Stage 5 Vuelta a Asturias
 10th Overall Vuelta a España
 10th Overall Vuelta a Murcia

Grand Tour general classification results timeline

References

External links
 

1967 births
Living people
Colombian male cyclists
Sportspeople from Boyacá Department